Jayamalini (or Jaya Malini) is an Indian actress who has acted in more than 500 Tamil, Telugu, Malayalam, Kannada and Hindi movies.

Career
She was introduced to Tollywood in 1975 by Vittalacharya in the movie he produced, Aadadani Adrustam. She acted in several Telugu, Tamil, Kannada and Malayalam movies. She learned dancing from Heeralal master.

Personal life
She married Parthiban, a police inspector on 19 July 1994 and settled in Chennai with her only son. In 2005, the former actress and dancer was busy looking for a writer to help pen her biography.

Her sister Jyothi Lakshmi was also a cabaret dancer in films.

Selected filmography

Tamil

 Salem Vishnu (1990)
 Aalay Pathu Malai Mathu (1990)
 Rathinapuri Ilavarasan (1989)
 Anthapura Marmam (1988)
 Makkal En Pakkam (1987)
 Kudumbam Oru Koyil (1987)
 Raja Nee Vazhga (1986)
 Andha Oru Nimidam (1985)
 Mayavi (1985)
 Erimalai (1985)
 Kutravaaligal (1985)
 Karuppu Sattaikaran (1985)
 Naam Iruvar (1985)
 Enaintha Kodugal (1985)
 Visha Kanni (1985)
 Andavan Sothu (1985)
 Malaiyoor Mambattiyan (1984)
 24 Mani Neram (1984)
 Uravai Katha Kili (1984)
 Nalla Naal (1984)
 Kudumbam (1984)
 Sarithira Nayagan (1984)
 Ullam Uruguthadi (1984)
 Veetuku Oru Kannagi (1984)
 Idhu Enga Bhoomi (1984)
 Nyayam Ketkiren (1984)
 Ennai Paar En Azhagai Paar (1983)
 Pani Puyal (1983)
 Raja Mohini (1983)
 Imaigal (1983)
 Ragam Thedum Pallavi (1982)
 Azhagiya Laila (1982)
 Mullillatha Roja (1982)
 Gopurangal Saivathillai (1982)
 Krodham (1982)
 Nadodi Raja (1982)
 Valibamey Vaa Vaa (1982)
 Marumagale Vazhga (1982)
 Thunaivi (1982)
 Kuppathu Ponnu (1982)
 Garjanai (1981)
 Sorgathin Thirappu Vizha (1981)
 Lorry Driver Rajakannu (1981)
 Kaalam (1981)
 Guru (1980)
 Maaya Mohini (1980)
 Anbukku Naan Adimai (1980)
 Maria My Darling (1980)
 Naan Potta Savaal (1980)
 Raman Parasuraman (1980)
 Bombay Mail 109 (1980)
 Natchathiram (1980)
 Andharangam Oomaiyanathu (1980)
 Engal Vathiyar (1980)
 Yamanukku Yaman (1980)
 Gandharva Kanni (1979)
 Nadagame Ulagam (1979)
 Kadavul Amaitha Medai (1979)
 Annai Oru Aalayam (1979)
 Velli Ratham (1979)
 Kannan Oru Kai Kuzhandhai (1978)
 Jaganmohini (1978)
 Karate Kamala (1978)
 Thai Meedhu Sathiyam (1978)
 Alli Darbar (1978)
 Thaaliya Salangaiya (1977)
 Aattukara Alamelu (1977)
 Sahodara Sapatham (1977)
 Sainthadamma Sainthadu (1977)
 Penn Jenmam (1977)
 Maharasi Vazhga (1976)
 Dr. Siva (1975) - Debut in Tamil

Telugu

 Aadadani Adrustam (1975)
 Annadammula Anubandham (1975)
 Guna Vanthudu (1975)
 Mutyala Muggu (1975)
 Bhakta Kannappa (1976)
 Bhale Dongalu (1976)
 Magaadu (1976)
 Ramarajamlo Rakthpasham (1976)
 Vintha Illu Santhagola (1976)
 Amara Deepam ("Kottaga Unda Badhaga Unda" song) (1977)
 Ardhangi (1977)
 Chakradhari (1977)
 Chanakya Chandragupta (1977)
 Daana Veera Soora Karna (1977)
 Devathalara Deevinchandi (1977)
 Gadusu Pillodu (1977)
 Khaidi Kalidas (1977)
 Yamagola ("Gudivada Ellanu" song) (1977)
 Agent Gopi (1978)
 Annadammula Savaal (1978)
 Athani Kante Ghanudu (1978)
 Chal Mohana Ranga (1978)
 Jaganmohini (1978)
 Mugguru Muggure (1978)
 Nayudu Bava (1978)
 Pottelu Punnamma (1978)
 Simha Baludu (1978)
 Bomma Boruse Jeevitham (1979)
 Burripalem Bulludu (1979)
 Driver Ramudu ("Guggu Guggu Gudisundi" song) (1979)
 Melu Kolupu (1979)
 Muthaiduva (1979)
 Sama Janiki Sawal (1979)
 Hema Hemeelu (1979)
 Tiger (1979)
 Vetagaadu ("Puttintollu Tarimesaaru" song) (1979)
 Yugandhar (1979)
 Shri Vinayaka Vijayamu (1979)
 Gandharva Kanya (1979)
 Sita Ramulu (1980)
 Kiladi Krishnudu (1980)
 Aatagadu ("Eko Narayana" song) (1980)
 Superman (1980)
 Challenge Ramudu (1980)
 Mama Allulla Saval (1980) as Vasantha/Raji
 Punnami Naagu (1980)
 Ragile Jwala (1981)
 Antham Kadidi Aarambam  (1981)
 Gaja Donga ("Nee Illu Bangaaram Gaanu" song) (1981)
 Kaliyuga Ramudu (1982)
 Bobbili Puli ("O Subba Rao" song) (1982)
 SAMSHARE SHANKER (1982)
 Manishiko Charithra (1982)
 Yamakinkarudu (1982)
 Siripuram Monagadu (1983)
 Maga Maharaju ("Maa Amma Chintamani" song) (1983)
 Simhapuri Simham (1983)
 Police Venkataswami (1983)
 Ramudu Kadu Krishnudu  (1983)
 Chattaniki Veyi Kallu (1983)
 Kirayi Kotigadu (1983)
 Chanda Sasanudu (1983)
 Merupu Daadi (1984)
 Police Papanna (1984)
 Hero (1984)
 Iddarudongalu (1984)
 GARJANA (1985)
 Jwala (1985)
 Cow Boy No 1 (1986)
 Ugra Narasimham (1986)
 Jailu Pakshi (1986)
 Aadi Dampathulu (1987)
 State Rowdy (1989)
 Ramudu Kadu Rakshasudu (1991)

Kannada

 Guru Shishyaru (1981)
 Bangarada Gudi (1976)
 Baddi Bangaramma
 Gayathri Maduve (1983)
 Rusthum Jodi (1981)
 Nanna Devaru (1982)
 Jayasimha
 Onde Guri (1979)
 Maralina Sarapali
 Matte Vasanta
 Sedina Hakki
 Kudure Mukha
 Muttaide Bhagya
 Police Papanna
 Sahodarara Savaal (1977)
 Sowbhagya Lakshmi
 Prachanda Kulla
 Bengaluru Ratriyalli
 Haddina Kannu
 Praja Prabhuthva
 Senha Sambandha
 Srhi Chamnudeshwari Pooja Mahime
 Vasantha Lakshmi (1978)
 Kiladi Jodi

Malayalam

 Omanakunju  (1975)
 Kaduvaye Pidicha Kiduva (1977)
 Aavesham (1979) as Rathi
 Sarapanjaram (1979)
 Shakti (1980)
 Nayattu (1980)
 Lava (1980)
 Hridayam Padunnu (1980)
 Poochasanyasi (1981)
 Dwanda Yudham (1981)
 Adima Changala (1981)
 Pineyum Pookkunna Kaadu (1981)
 Akkramanam (1981)
 Sanchari (1981)
 Kaahalam (1981)
 Thadavara (1981)
 Sreeman Sreemathi (1981)
 Chambalkkadu (1982)
 Kalam (1982)
 Amritageetham (1982)
Kaathirunna Divasam (1983) 
Kilikonchal (1984) 
 Shathru (1985)
 Urukku Manushyan (1986)
 Ee Noottandile Maharogam (1987)
 Deerga Sumangalee Bava (1988)
 Abkari (1988)
 Prabhatham Chuvanna Theruvil (1989)
 Kadathanadan Ambadi (1990)
 Criminals (1994)
 Paathira Sooryan

Hindi
 Jeevan Jyoti (1976) as Sudha
 Shalimar (1978) as Tribal Dancer
 Lok Parlok (1979)
 Maha Shaktimaan (1988) as Sorceress
 Yuvraaj (1979) as one of the two dancers

References

External links
 

Living people
Year of birth missing (living people)
Actresses in Kannada cinema
Actresses in Tamil cinema
Actresses in Telugu cinema
Indian film actresses
Actresses in Malayalam cinema
Actresses in Hindi cinema
Actresses from Tamil Nadu
People from Nellore district
20th-century Indian actresses